The 2020–21 NBL season was the 40th season for the Perth Wildcats in the NBL.

Roster

Squad

Pre-season

Ladder

Game log 

|-style="background:#cfc;"
| 1
| 15 December
| The Hawks
| W 91–83
| Bryce Cotton (25)
| John Mooney (8)
| Mitch Norton (4)  
| RAC Arenanot announced
| 1–0
|-style="background:#fcc;"
| 2
| 17 December
| The Hawks
| L 74–82
| John Mooney (19)
| John Mooney (13)
| Mitch Norton (5) 
| Bendat Basketball Centrenot announced
| 1–1

Regular season

Ladder

Game log 

|-style="background:#cfc;"
| 1
| 24 January
| South East Melbourne
| W 88–76
| Bryce Cotton (27)
| John Mooney (14)
| Bryce Cotton (7)
| RAC Arena7,150
| 1–0
|-style="background:#fcc;"
| 2
| 29 January
| South East Melbourne
| L 89–90
| Bryce Cotton (32)
| John Mooney (13)
| Bryce Cotton (6)
| RAC Arena7,150
| 1–1

|-style="background:#fcc;"
| 3
| 7 February
| @ Melbourne
| L 75–71
| Bryce Cotton (24)
| Cotton, Mooney, Wagstaff (7)
| Bryce Cotton (6)
| Bendigo Stadium1,953
| 1–2
|-style="background:#cfc;"
| 4
| 11 February
| @ South East Melbourne
| W 75–106
| Todd Blanchfield (22)
| John Mooney (13)
| Bryce Cotton (7)
| State Basketball Centre1,875
| 2–2
|-style="background:#fcc;"
| 5
| 14 February
| @ South East Melbourne
| L 96–71
| John Mooney (19)
| John Mooney (10)
| Bryce Cotton (9)
| State Basketball Centreclosed event
| 2–3

|-style="background:#cfc;"
| 6
| 20 February
| @ Melbourne
| W 85–89
| Bryce Cotton (29)
| John Mooney (9)
| Bryce Cotton (7)
| John Cain Arena3,711
| 3–3
|-style="background:#cfc;"
| 7
| 23 February
| @ Sydney
| W 106–113
| Cotton, Mooney (30)
| John Mooney (16)
| Bryce Cotton (9)
| John Cain Arena1,079
| 4–3
|-style="background:#cfc;"
| 8
| 26 February
| @ Cairns
| W 69–89
| Bryce Cotton (23)
| John Mooney (12)
| Bryce Cotton (9)
| John Cain Arena809
| 5–3
|-style="background:#cfc;"
| 9
| 3 March
| South East Melbourne
| W 93–92
| Bryce Cotton (28)
| John Mooney (11)
| Mitch Norton (8)
| State Basketball Centre2,257
| 6–3
|-style="background:#fcc;"
| 10
| 5 March
| Brisbane
| L 92–95
| Bryce Cotton (29)
| John Mooney (9)
| Cotton, Jervis, Mooney (4)
| John Cain Arena3,421
| 6–4
|-style="background:#cfc;"
| 11
| 7 March
| @ Illawarra
| W 70–87
| Bryce Cotton (18)
| John Mooney (10)
| Mitch Norton (6)
| John Cain Arena3,696
| 7–4
|-style="background:#cfc;"
| 12
| 12 March
| New Zealand
| W 85–75
| Bryce Cotton (24)
| John Mooney (12)
| Bryce Cotton (7)
| John Cain Arena2,478
| 8–4
|-style="background:#cfc;"
| 13
| 14 March
| Adelaide
| W 97–88
| Bryce Cotton (34)
| John Mooney (16)
| Bryce Cotton (7)
| John Cain Arena4,019
| 9–4

|-style="background:#cfc;"
| 14
| 19 March
| Cairns
| W 93–75
| Bryce Cotton (28)
| John Mooney (8)
| Bryce Cotton (5)
| RAC Arena9,997
| 10–4
|-style="background:#cfc;"
| 15
| 22 March
| Adelaide
| W 92–82
| Bryce Cotton (36)
| John Mooney (14)
| Bryce Cotton (6)
| RAC Arena9,550
| 11–4
|-style="background:#cfc;"
| 16
| 26 March
| Illawarra
| W 81–70
| Bryce Cotton (22)
| John Mooney (16)
| Bryce Cotton (5)
| RAC Arena10,216
| 12–4
|-style="background:#cfc;"
| 17
| 28 March
| @ Sydney
| W 65–89
| Bryce Cotton (29)
| John Mooney (18)
| Cotton, Mooney (4)
| Qudos Bank Arena5,067
| 13–4

|-style="background:#cfc;"
| 18
| 1 April
| Sydney
| W 95–89
| Bryce Cotton (22)
| John Mooney (11)
| Mitch Norton (7)
| RAC Arena10,123
| 14–4
|-style="background:#cfc;"
| 19
| 8 April
| @ Sydney
| W 69–73
| Bryce Cotton (23)
| Mooney, Wagstaff (10)
| Bryce Cotton (6)
| Qudos Bank Arena4,115
| 15–4
|-style="background:#fcc;"
| 20
| 10 April
| @ Adelaide
| L 83–68
| John Mooney (18)
| John Mooney (14)
| John Mooney (4)
| Adelaide Entertainment Centre6,339
| 15–5
|-style="background:#cfc;"
| 21
| 13 April
| @ New Zealand
| W 79–85 (OT)
| Bryce Cotton (34)
| Bairstow, Mooney, Norton (9)
| Cotton, Mooney (3)
| Silverdome1,358
| 16–5
|-style="background:#cfc;"
| 22
| 16 April
| Illawarra
| W 83–69
| Blanchfield, Cotton (18)
| John Mooney (15)
| Mitch Norton (5)
| RAC Arena11,485
| 17–5
|-style="background:#fcc;"
| 23
| 18 April
| New Zealand
| L 78–83
| John Mooney (22)
| John Mooney (8)
| Bryce Cotton (9)
| RAC Arena11,316
| 17–6
|-style="background:#cfc;"
| 24
| 23 April
| Brisbane
| W 92–74
| Bryce Cotton (21)
| John Mooney (13)
| John Mooney (7)
| RAC Arena4,737
| 18–6

|-style="background:#fcc;"
| 25
| 1 May
| @ New Zealand
| L 86–84
| John Mooney (25)
| John Mooney (9)
| Blanchfield, Mooney, Norton (4)
| Silverdome1,621
| 18–7
|-style="background:#cfc;"
| 26
| 5 May
| @ Melbourne
| W 69–82
| John Mooney (30)
| John Mooney (14)
| Bryce Cotton (10)
| John Cain Arena2,011
| 19–7
|-style="background:#cfc;"
| 27
| 9 May
| New Zealand
| W 98–84
| Bryce Cotton (32)
| John Mooney (9)
| Bryce Cotton (10)
| RAC Arena10,518
| 20–7
|-style="background:#fcc;"
| 28
| 13 May
| Melbourne
| L 91–99
| Cotton, Mooney (24)
| John Mooney (14)
| John Mooney (5)
| RAC Arena9,987
| 20–8
|-style="background:#cfc;"
| 29
| 15 May
| @ Brisbane
| W 90–102
| Todd Blanchfield (31)
| Mitch Norton (8)
| John Mooney (5)
| Nissan Arena3,405
| 21–8
|-style="background:#cfc;"
| 30
| 17 May
| @ Cairns
| W 78–89
| Bryce Cotton (24)
| John Mooney (10)
| Bryce Cotton (5)
| Cairns Pop-Up Arena1,811
| 22–8
|-style="background:#fcc;"
| 31
| 19 May
| @ Brisbane
| L 91–88
| Clint Steindl (25)
| Bairstow, Mooney (7)
| Bryce Cotton (5)
| Nissan Arena1,332
| 22–9
|-style="background:#cfc;"
| 32
| 21 May
| Cairns
| W 100–79
| Blanchfield, Cotton (19)
| Will Magnay (9)
| Mitch Norton (5)
| RAC Arena10,671
| 23–9
|-style="background:#cfc;"
| 33
| 23 May
| @ Adelaide
| W 68–76
| Mitch Norton (19)
| John Mooney (12)
| John Mooney (5)
| Adelaide Entertainment Centre6,422
| 24–9
|-style="background:#cfc;"
| 34
| 27 May
| Sydney
| W 81–67
| Todd Blanchfield (23)
| John Mooney (10)
| Mitch Norton (6)
| RAC Arena10,650
| 25–9

|-style="background:#fcc;"
| 35
| 1 June
| @ Illawarra
| L 81–79
| Clint Steindl (15)
| John Mooney (15)
| Mitch Norton (9)
| WIN Entertainment Centre2,038
| 25–10
|-style="background:#fcc;"
| 36
| 4 June
| Melbourne
| L 64–78
| Todd Blanchfield (15)
| Luke Travers (8)
| Kevin White (6)
| RAC Arena12,185
| 25–11

Postseason

|-style="background:#fcc;"
| 1
| 10 June
| Illawarra
| L 72–74
| Todd Blanchfield (24)
| John Mooney (16)
| Bairstow, Norton (3)
| RAC Arena7,662
| 0–1
|-style="background:#cfc;"
| 2
| 12 June
| @ Illawarra
| W 71–79
| John Mooney (18)
| Luke Travers (10)
| Kevin White (5)
| WIN Entertainment Centre5,217
| 1–1
|-style="background:#cfc;"
| 3
| 14 June
| Illawarra
| W 79–71
| Todd Blanchfield (24)
| John Mooney (14)
| Luke Travers (4)
| RAC Arena8,986
| 2–1

|-style="background:#fcc;"
| 1
| 18 June
| Melbourne
| L 70–73
| Todd Blanchfield (27)
| Blanchfield, Mooney (7)
| John Mooney (4)
| RAC Arena9,951
| 0–1
|-style="background:#fcc;"
| 2
| 20 June
| Melbourne
| L 74–83
| John Mooney (17)
| John Mooney (9)
| Mooney, Shervill (3)
| RAC Arena11,097
| 0–2
|-style="background:#fcc;"
| 3
| 25 June
| @ Melbourne
| L 81–76
| Mooney, White (14)
| John Mooney (13)
| Mitch Norton (3)
| John Cain Arena4,507
| 0–3

Transactions

Re-signed

Additions

Subtractions

Awards

Player of the Week 
Round 8, John Mooney

Round 10, Bryce Cotton

Round 11, John Mooney

Round 16, John Mooney

Round 17, Bryce Cotton

See also 

 2020–21 NBL season
 Perth Wildcats

References

External links 

 Official Website

Perth Wildcats
Perth Wildcats seasons
Perth Wildcats season